Yoon Yeo-San (born 9 July 1982) is a South Korean footballer who currently plays as a defender.

Club career
Yoon began his professional career with Incheon United, joining the club as a foundation squad member when it entered the K-League in 2004.  However, in a two-year spell with the club, he made only a single appearance, in a 2005 FA Cup match.

Yoon then moved to Daegu FC.  Initially, he did not play a significant on-field role, although over time he has become a regular starter, playing 26 games in total for the 2009 season. In November 2009, he moved to Sangju Sangmu while he completed his two-year military obligations.

In July 2011, he related 2011 South Korean football betting scandal.

Career statistics

External links 

1982 births
Living people
Association football defenders
Hannam University alumni
South Korean footballers
Incheon United FC players
Daegu FC players
Gimcheon Sangmu FC players
K League 1 players